Darryl Borlase is a former Australian rules footballer who played for the Port Adelaide Football Club.

Football 
Borlase was recruited by Port Adelaide from the Ceduna Football Club. He would debut for Port Adelaide in 1985 playing 5 games in his first season.

Borlase would go on to have a successful career with Port Adelaide winning four South Australian National Football League (SANFL) premierships during his time at the club. 

However, he was also unfortunate to miss the 1988, 1989, 1999 and 1995 SANFL Grand Finals due to injury. 

In his final year at Port Adelaide, he captained the SANFL side to victory in the 1998 Grand Final.

Agriculture 
Borlase is an agribusiness executive being a graduate from the University of Adelaide. He began his career in agriculture  with the South Australian Cooperative Bulk Handler. He has also worked for the Australian Wheat Board both in Australia and overseas.

Darryl currently works for Archer Daniel Midland.

Personal life 
Darryl is married to Jenny Borlase who represented Australia in netball from 1989-1999, and won a gold medal at the 1998 Commonwealth games and three netball world titles in 1991, 1995 and 1999.

References

Australian rules footballers from South Australia
Port Adelaide Football Club (SANFL) players
Port Adelaide Football Club players (all competitions)
Living people
Year of birth missing (living people)
Port Adelaide Magpies players